ORP Kaszub  was a torpedo boat of the Polish Navy, and one of the first ships of that navy after Poland regained its independence in 1918. It was originally built by the German shipyard A.G. Vulcan for the Netherlands Navy as Z4, but was still under construction at the outbreak of the First World War in August 1914, and was seized by the Imperial German Navy, being renamed V108.

V108 served in the Baltic and for training during the war, and when the German Navy was broken up after the end of the war, was allocated to Poland, with the name Kaszub. It was sunk on 20 July 1925 by a boiler explosion.

History 
V108 was originally ordered by the Koninklijke Marine (Dutch Navy) as the torpedo boat Z-4 (along with sister ships Z-1, Z-2 and Z-3), one of four  (Dutch: Very large) torpedo boats to be built by A.G. Vulcan in their Stettin, Germany (now Szczecin, Poland) shipyard. The four ships were taken over by Germany for incorporation into the Kaiserliche Marine (German Navy) while still under construction on 10 August 1914 owing to the outbreak of the First World War, with Z4 being renamed SMS V108. The ship was launched on 12 December 1914 and completed in March 1915.

Displacement was  normal and  full load.

The Dutch specified an armament of two 75 mm (3-inch) guns and four 450 mm torpedo tubes, but the ship was completed with an armament of two 8.8 cm SK L/30 guns and two 450 mm torpedo tubes. V108 had a crew of three officers and 57 other ranks.

Service

World War I
The newly completed V108 and  joined the 10th Torpedo Boat Flotilla  in the Baltic Sea in April 1915. That month, the German Army had begun an offensive in the Baltic as a diversion for the Gorlice–Tarnów Offensive, with the Navy deployed in support of the Army's operations. On 24 April 1915, V108 shelled Russian troops near Palanga, Courland (now part of Lithuania). On the night of 30 April/1 May 1915, V107 and V108 made a sortie into the Gulf of Riga, reconnoitring the island of Ruhnu and shelling lighthouses.

From 3 to 5 June 1915, German naval forces, including V108 carried out an attempted penetration of the Irben Strait with the intention of mining the southern entrance to the Moon Sound, while the seaplane carrier 's aircraft would attack a factory near Daugavgrīva. The presence of large numbers of Russian warships (including 16 destroyers and torpedo boats) resulted in the operation being abandoned, but on the return journey to Libau, Glyndwr ran into a previously undiscovered Russian minefield off Windau on 4 June, striking one mine, which badly damaged the seaplane carrier, causing serious flooding. V108 took Glyndwr under tow, and with the assistance of minesweepers took Glyndwr back to Libau.

In August 1915, V108 took part in the Battle of the Gulf of Riga, an attempt by German forces, supported by the High Seas Fleet, to enter the Gulf of Riga, destroy Russian naval forces in the Gulf and to mine the northern entrances to the Gulf in order to prevent Russian reinforcement. On 20 August, in one of the last actions of the battle, V108 took part in an attack on Pernau, with blockships being used to block the entrance to the harbour.

In 1916, V108 was relegated to training duties, remaining on training duties at the end of the war.

Polish service 
In June 1919, Treaty of Versailles required that the German Navy surrender most of its remaining warships for division between the victorious powers. In December 1919, Poland was allocated six torpedo boats, which were to be supplied unarmed for police duties. One of the ships chosen by Poland was V-108, which was renamed Kaszub together with sister ship V-105 (which became ) and four smaller A-class coastal torpedo boats. Kaszub, after refit at Rosyth Dockyard, arrived at Danzig on 3 October 1921. (Like all of the torpedo boats transferred to Poland, Kaszub suffered mechanical problems and was delivered under tow).

Kaszub was initially fitted with two 47 mm guns and two machine guns for service with the Polish Navy, but was rearmed in 1924–25, with two 75 mm guns and two 450 mm torpedo tubes, together with rails for laying mines.

Demise 
On 20 July 1925, a boiler explosion wrecked Kaszub while in dock in Danzig, with the forward part of the ship sinking. Three crewmen died. The remains were salvaged on 26 July 1925 and scrapped.

References

Bibliography

See also 
 SMS V106
 SMS V107

Ships built in Stettin
World War I torpedo boats of Germany
Torpedo boats of the Polish Navy
1914 ships
Torpedo boats of the Imperial German Navy